Mangalan Master is the nom de guerre of a candidate for the TMVP contesting Polonnaruwa District for the United People's Freedom Alliance in Sri Lanka. He is a former LTTE cadre, third in line for TMVP leadership after defecting to the party of Colonel Karuna and a staunch Karuna partisan during intra-TMVP feuds. The LTTE made an attempt on his life with claymore bombs in 2005.

References

Liberation Tigers of Tamil Eelam members
Living people
Sri Lankan Hindus
Sri Lankan Tamil politicians
Sri Lankan Tamil rebels
Tamil Makkal Viduthalai Pulikal politicians
Year of birth missing (living people)